Muhal Richard Abrams (born Richard Lewis Abrams; September 19, 1930 – October 29, 2017) was an American educator, administrator, composer, arranger, clarinetist, cellist, and jazz pianist in the free jazz medium. He recorded and toured the United States, Canada and Europe with his orchestra, sextet, quartet, duo and as a solo pianist. His musical affiliations constitute a "who's who" of the jazz world, including Max Roach, Dexter Gordon, Eddie "Lockjaw" Davis, Art Farmer, Sonny Stitt, Anthony Braxton, and The Art Ensemble of Chicago.

Early life
Abrams's mother, Edna, was born in Memphis. His father, Milton, was born in Alabama and moved with his parents to Chicago. Richard Lewis Abrams was born there, the second of nine children, on September 19, 1930. His father became a self-employed handyman; his mother was a housewife. "Abrams's paternal grandfather was 'what you call a junk man', selling the fruits of neighborhood foraging. Abrams and his brother would pull the cart around the neighborhood, eventually arriving at a junk-yard on State Street, where the items would be sold." Abrams first attended Forrestville public school in Chicago. He grew up in a gang area; truancy and fighting meant that he was sent to Moseley School, a reformatory school for boys. There, in addition to strict discipline, he was taught about black histories. He later moved on to DuSable High School. Although he was aware of the strong music program there, led by Walter Dyett, Abrams preferred playing sports, so did not participate in Dyett's classes. Among the future musicians Abrams met at the school were Charles Davis, Richard Davis, John Gilmore, Johnny Griffin, Laurdine Patrick, and Julian Priester.

As a child, Abrams was interested in the arts – film, painting, sculpture, and music. He later recounted that, in 1946, he decided to concentrate on the last of these, so left school and started piano lessons with a classically trained church pianist. He went on to study at the Metropolitan School of Music, which merged with Roosevelt University. "Supporting his studies in counterpoint, keyboard harmony, theory, and composition with a day job at a downtown printing company, Abrams eventually bought a second-hand piano." He also dropped out of his music school, reporting of his studies: "I didn't get too much out of that, because it wasn't what I was hearing in the street". He then decided to study independently: "I've always had a natural ability to study and analyze things. I used that ability, not even knowing what it was (it was just a feeling) and started to read books." In Abrams' words: From there, I acquired a small spinet piano and started to teach myself how to play the instrument and read the notes – or, first of all, what key the music was in. It took time and a lot of sweat. But I analyzed it and before long I was playing with the musicians on the scene. I listened to Art Tatum, Charlie Parker, Thelonious Monk, Bud Powell and many others and concentrated on Duke Ellington and Fletcher Henderson for composition. Later I got scores and studied more extensive things that take place in classical composition and started to practice classical pieces on the piano.

Later life and career

1950s and 1960s
Abrams started out "playing all kinds of gigs - blues, jazz, stage shows, rhythm and blues, and church socials." His musical abilities earned him jobs working with "everyone from Dexter Gordon and Max Roach to Ruth Brown and Woody Shaw."

In the mid-1950s, Abrams was becoming better known as both a pianist and a composer. A strong influence on his direction as a pianist at that time was King Fleming, for whom Abrams also composed and arranged. Another local man, William E. Jackson, helped Abrams develop his arranging and orchestration skills. Abrams co-founded a quintet named the MJT+3, and recorded with them in 1957, resulting in Daddy-O Presents MJT+3, which contained several of his compositions. Abrams also became more involved in investigating the "occult arts" around 1959 or 1960, and joined the Rosicrucians.

Abrams's son, Richard Jr., was at high school in the early 1960s.

Still eager for self-development, Abrams was introduced to, and then acquired, books on musical composition written by Joseph Schillinger. In the books, Abrams found topics that resonated, including the incorporation of spirituality into music. At a more practical, level, the pianist reported that "The Schillinger stuff taught me to break things back down into raw material – where it came from – and then, on to the whole idea of a personal or individual approach to composition."

Abrams was able to apply his learning after organising young musicians in the area into an ensemble that rehearsed at the C&C Lounge in Chicago from 1961. This became known as the Experimental Band, and "became a forum for Abrams to test his new, Schillinger-influenced compositional palette."

Around 1963, Abrams was part of a trio with bassist Donald Rafael Garrett and drummer Steve McCall. The pianist lived with his wife, Peggy, in a small basement apartment on South Evans Avenue. It was the location for nightly gatherings of musicians from the area, who "would explore musical, cultural, political, social, and spiritual ideas." Abrams found that he was in, and wanted to be in, the position that Fleming and Jackson had been with him – helping younger and less experienced musicians to develop. The Experimental Band, led by Abrams, encouraged cooperation, knowledge exchange, and the playing of its members' compositions. In interviews in later years, Abrams tended to downplay his influence on other, younger musicians. They, however, remembered things differently: "Everybody was following him around like little puppies", said saxophonist Gene Dinwiddie, while Roscoe Mitchell summarized that "He would always be turning people on to books, and talking about scores. Maybe he just doesn't realize the effect that he had on people's lives."

The Experimental Band had very few, if any, public performances. Although some rehearsal tapes were made, these were for study purposes and were routinely recorded over.

In 1965, four men – Abrams, pianist Jodie Christian, composer Phil Cohran, and drummer Steve McCall – agreed to form a new organization of musicians. They invited mostly other African Americans to the first meeting, on May 8, at which they discussed the principles of the nascent organization, the primary one being that it would be for original, creative music. At the second meeting, Abrams was elected president. Later in the month, an official name was chosen – the Association for the Advancement of Creative Musicians (AACM). When the AACM started a school in 1967, Abrams led the classes in composition.

Further exposure with the AACM helped Abrams get a recording contract with Delmark Records. His first album for them, Levels and Degrees of Light, was recorded in 1967, and featured the recording debuts of saxophonist Anthony Braxton, violinist Leroy Jenkins, and bassist Leonard Jones.

Rather than playing in smoky night clubs, AACM members often rented out theaters and lofts where they could perform for attentive and open-minded audiences.

"Abrams took the name Muhal in 1967. Interviewed by the French magazine Jazz in 1973, he said that the word, its origin unclear, means 'number one'."

Abrams also played with saxophonists Eddie Harris, Gordon, and other more bop-oriented musicians during this era.

1970s and 1980s, Loft jazz era

In the 1970s, Abrams composed for symphony orchestras, string quartets, solo piano, voice, and big bands in addition to making a series of larger ensemble recordings that included harp and accordion. In the early 1970s, his big band had a weekly concert at the Transitions East performance space in Chicago. Abrams formed a sextet from other AACM members in 1972. The other musicians were Reggie Willis on bass, Steve McCall on drums, and Kalaparusha Difda, Wallace McMillan, and Henry Threadgill on various woodwind and saxophone instruments. With this band, Abrams had his first international concerts, playing the Berlin Jazz Festival in 1973. He had a successful solo concert at the Montreaux Jazz Festival the following year, as well as touring Europe with the Art Ensemble of Chicago.

During this time, Abrams recorded extensively under his own name (frequently on the Black Saint label), and as a sideman for musicians such as Marion Brown (Sweet Earth Flying, 1974), Anthony Braxton (Duets 1976, 1976), Roscoe Mitchell (Roscoe Mitchell Quartet, 1976), and Chico Freeman (Morning Prayer, 1976, and Chico, 1977).

Abrams left Chicago for New York in 1976. After initially living with other musicians, he moved his family there the following year. The move of city was partly to be at the centre of musical activity, and partly for financial reasons. Initially, there were very few concerts, but he garnered press attention and was able to record annually with Black Saint. Experience in writing extended compositions also helped Abrams and other AACM musicians in New York: "The compositions themselves showed that they were outside of the mainstream of jazz, and notice was taken by classical people. You can get access to these [classical music] ensembles, and it started to happen."

In the late 1970s, Abrams was also part of the jazz peer-review panels for the National Endowment for the Arts. "As a Chicagoan who was identified with experimental music, yet who was respected by the ancien regime, Abrams was uniquely positioned to take a leading role in guiding the broad changes in both the demographics and the aesthetic directions of the panels that gradually took place."

His 1-OQA+19 "juxtaposed complex written passages with propulsive rhythms"; and Lifea Blinec "presented multi-instrumentalism, text-sound, and electronic textures."

He was involved in the local Loft Jazz scene in New York. In 1982, he presented an orchestral work at that year's New Music America festival in Chicago. He also helped set up the New York Chapter of the AACM, which first presented concerts in the city in 1982.

1990–2017
In 1990 Abrams won the Jazzpar Prize, an annual Danish prize within jazz. Abrams received a 1997 Foundation for Contemporary Arts Grants to Artists Award. In 2005, the fortieth anniversary of the founding of the AACM, some of Abrams's solo and ensemble pieces were presented by the organization in New York. In May 2009 the National Endowment for the Arts announced that Abrams would be one of the recipients of the 2010 NEA Jazz Masters Award. In June 2010, Abrams was given the Lifetime Achievement Award by New York City's premier jazz festival, known as the Vision Festival. Abrams died at his home in Manhattan, at the age of 87. His daughter, Richarda, became an actress and singer.

Influence
He is a widely influential artist, having played sides for many musicians early in his career, releasing important recordings as a leader, and writing classical works such as his "String Quartet No. 2", which was performed by the Kronos Quartet, on November 22, 1985, at the Carnegie Recital Hall in New York.

Discography

As leader

As sideman 
With Art Ensemble of Chicago
Fanfare for the Warriors (Atlantic, 1974)
Kabalaba (AECO, 1978)

With Barry Altschul
You Can't Name Your Own Tune (1977)

With Hamiet Bluiett
Saying Something for All (1998)

With Anthony Braxton
Three Compositions of New Jazz (Delmark, 1968)
Creative Orchestra Music 1976 (Arista, 1976)
Duets 1976 (Arista, 1976)
Quintet (Basel) 1977 (hatOLOGY, 1977 [2000])
 Live At The Rainbow Gallery '79 (Hi Hat, 2016)

With Marion Brown
Sweet Earth Flying (Impulse!, 1974)

With Creative Construction Company
Creative Construction Company (Muse, 1970 [1975])
Creative Construction Company Vol. II (Muse, 1970 [1976])

With Jack DeJohnette
Made in Chicago (ECM, 2013 [2015]) with Larry Gray, Roscoe Mitchell and Henry Threadgill

With Kenny Dorham
Kenny Dorham Sextet (1970)

With Marty Ehrlich
Emergency Peace (1990)

With Chico Freeman
Morning Prayer (1976)
Chico (1977)
Freeman & Freeman (1981)

With Barry Harris
 Interpretations Of Monk Vol. 1 (Koch Jazz, 1997) with Don Cherry, Steve Lacy, Charlie Rouse, Roswell Rudd, Richard Davis, Ben Riley, Ed Blackwell

With Eddie Harris
Instant Death (Atlantic, 1971)
Eddie Harris Sings the Blues (Atlantic, 1972)
Excursions (Atlantic, 1973)
 That Is Why You're Overweight (Atlantic, 1975)

With Joseph Jarman
As If It Were the Seasons (1968)

With Leroy Jenkins
Lifelong Ambitions (Black Saint, 1977)

With Clifford Jordan
Inward Fire (Muse, 1978)

With Robin Kenyatta
Beggars and Stealers (1977)

With George E. Lewis
Shadowgraph (1978, Black Saint)

With Roscoe Mitchell
Nonaah (1967)
Roscoe Mitchell Quartet (1975)
Duets and Solos (1990)
Live At "A Space" 1975 (Delmark, 2013 DiscogsAllMusic)

With Walter Perkins MJT+3
Daddy-O Presents MJT+3 (1957)

With Woody Shaw
 The Iron Men with Anthony Braxton (Muse, 1977 [1980])

With Sonny Stitt
 Soul Girl (Paula Records, 1973)

Gallery

References

Bibliography

External links 
Muhal Richard Abrams Website

 Muhal Richard Abrams at the Association for the Advancement of Creative Musicians

1930 births
2017 deaths
African-American jazz composers
African-American jazz pianists
Musicians from Chicago
Free jazz pianists
Free jazz composers
Pi Recordings artists
Novus Records artists
Delmark Records artists
20th-century jazz composers
21st-century jazz composers
21st-century American composers
American male jazz composers
American jazz composers
20th-century American composers
Jazz musicians from Illinois
American male pianists
20th-century American male musicians
21st-century American male musicians
Creative Construction Company members
20th-century African-American musicians
21st-century African-American musicians